Benas Veikalas (born 24 September 1983) is a Lithuanian former professional basketball player. He can play both guard positions, but prefers the shooting guard position.

Early career
Born in Joniškis, Veikalas moved to the United States at the age of 18 and played basketball at Horizon High School in San Diego, California. After high school, he was recruited by Mike Dunlap to play for Metropolitan State University of Denver, an NCAA Division II team. He led the team his senior year, averaging 9.2 points, 3.3 rebounds and 2.1 assists in 22 minutes per game.

Professional career
Veikalas returned to Lithuania for his first season as a professional. He played for BC Nevėžis of LKL. After two successful seasons, he moved to Czech Republic and signed with BK Prostějov. With BK Prostějov, Veikalas led the team in scoring, played Euro- challenge, and the team finished runner up in the National Title games, 2 years in a row. After 2 seasons with BK Prostějov, In 2011, he joined Telekom Baskets Bonn. With Telekom Bonn, he led in scoring, was voted to the National All Star Team, was Voted to All Decade Legend team, made 3 appearances in the top 4 German national cup, played across Europe in the Euro-Cup, and was team captain. In 2013, Veikalas extended his contract with the team for two more seasons. In 2015, and 4 years in Bonn, Veikalas signed with S.S. Scandone Veikalas played in the Euro-Cup, National Italian Top 4, and finished in the top 4 of National Playoffs.  Veikalas returned to Germany to finish his career in 2016-2017. BG Goettingen Veikalas was offered an additional contract in Gottingen, however decided it was time to retire.

Personal life
Benas Veikalas is married to Stacey Veikalas and they have 3 children. Anthony Veikalas, Vincas Veikalas, & Amber Veikalas.

References

External links
 Metro State profile

1983 births
Living people
BC Nevėžis players
BG Göttingen players
Lithuanian men's basketball players
Lithuanian expatriate basketball people in Germany
Lithuanian expatriate basketball people in the United States
Metro State Roadrunners men's basketball players
People from Joniškis
S.S. Felice Scandone players
Shooting guards
Telekom Baskets Bonn players